State Street Historic District is a national historic district located at North Vernon, Jennings County, Indiana.  It encompasses 75 contributing buildings and 4 contributing structures in a predominantly residential of North Vernon.  The district developed between about 1852 and 1950, and includes notable examples of Queen Anne and Bungalow / American Craftsman style architecture. Notable contributing buildings include the First Baptist Church (1905), First Presbyterian Church (1871), Olcott House (now Dove, Sharp, and Rudicel Funeral Home, 1907), McGannon-Olcott House (c. 1868), Charles Watchell House (c. 1893), Frank Little House (c. 1898), Tripp / Verbarg House (c. 1891), and Joseph C. Cone House (c. 1894).

It was listed on the National Register of Historic Places in 2007.

References

Historic districts on the National Register of Historic Places in Indiana
Queen Anne architecture in Indiana
Historic districts in Jennings County, Indiana
National Register of Historic Places in Jennings County, Indiana